Eugène Lesieur (24 March 1890 – 2 April 1975) was a French wrestler. He competed in the lightweight event at the 1912 Summer Olympics.

References

External links
 

1890 births
1975 deaths
Olympic wrestlers of France
Wrestlers at the 1912 Summer Olympics
French male sport wrestlers
Sportspeople from Paris
20th-century French people